The Left Opposition was a Pro-Russian coalition of socio-political organizations and parties in Ukraine established in June 2015.

On March 19, 2022, the activities of the political group were suspended by the National Security and Defense Council during martial law.

Leadership 
The association is headed by 5 co-chairs:

 Petro Symonenko – First Secretary of the Central Committee of the Communist Party of Ukraine
 Nataliya Vitrenko – Chairwoman of the Progressive Socialist Party of Ukraine
 Valery Soldatenko – former director of the Ukrainian Institute of National Memory
 Rudolf Povarnitsyn – world record holder in athletics
 Heorhiy Kryuchkov – member of the Communist Party of Ukraine

Members 
The association includes 5 political parties, 13 public organizations and 6 individuals. 

Parties:

 Communist Party of Ukraine (banned 15 December 2015)
 Progressive Socialist Party of Ukraine (banned 20 March 2022)
 "Kievan Rus'" Party
 Workers' Party of Ukraine
 Slavic Party of Ukraine
 New Power Party (entered on 24 September 2015)

Public organizations:

 Anti-Fascist Committee of Ukraine
 All-Ukrainian Union of Workers
 All-Ukrainian Union of Soviet Officers
 All-Ukrainian Women's Organization "The Gift of Life"
 Eurasian People's Union
 Association "For the Union of Ukraine, Belarus and Russia" (ZUBR)
 Association "Intelligentsia of Ukraine - for socialism"
 Leninist Communist Youth Union of Ukraine
 Labor Conference of Ukraine
 Slavic Committee of Ukraine
 Cathedral of Orthodox Women of Ukraine
 Communist Student Council
 Union of Orthodox Brotherhoods of Ukraine

Individuals:

 Petro Tolochko — National Academy of Sciences of Ukraine

It was also announced that the vicegerent of the Kyiv Pechersk Lavra, Metropolitan Pavel (Lebed), close to the Communist Party of Ukraine, could join the movement. The Socialist Party of Ukraine and the All-Ukrainian Public Movement "Ukrainian Choice" of Viktor Medvedchuk refused to participate in the association.

Ideology 
Political theses of the organization:

 The events of February 2014 are a "coup d'état" that led Ukraine to the loss of economic and political independence;
 The domestic and foreign policy of Ukraine is “determined by the United States of America, international financial oligarchies”;
 Ukraine is “united by a common history, culture, spirituality, civilizational values” with Russia and Belarus, but not with the USA and EU countries;
 The territorial integrity and independence of Ukraine were preserved only in the conditions of the unity of "our countries (Ukraine, Russia, Belarus) and fraternal peoples";
 Organization denounces laws condemning communist ideology;
 The organization condemns the course towards the integration of Ukraine with Europe.

Goals:

 Joining the Customs Union with Russia;
 Russian as a second state language;
 "Restoration of good neighborly, equal and mutually beneficial relations" with the Russian Federation and Belarus.

History 
On 12 June 2015, the constituent assembly of the political movement was held in Kyiv.

Criticism

Name theft charge 
The eponymous socialist organization "Left Opposition" (one of the successors of the Organization of Marxists, mainly from its Trotskyist wing; its representatives create a new left party "Social Rukh") accused "representatives of the previous authorities (KPU), marginal Russophiles ("Kievan Rus") and Black Hundreds (PSPU), who parasitize on the left movement”, of stealing its name. According to the statement of its activist Nina Potarskaya, their organization is named after the leftists of the 20s with whom they associate themselves (leftists in the Central Rada and the Left Opposition in the VKP(b) opposing Stalinism).

References

2015 establishments in Ukraine
Banned political parties in Ukraine
Conservative parties in Ukraine
Defunct political party alliances in Ukraine
Defunct socialist parties in Ukraine
Eurasianism
Left-wing nationalist parties
Pan-Slavism
Political parties disestablished in 2022
Political parties established in 2015
Russian nationalism in Ukraine
Russian political parties in Ukraine
Social conservative parties